Warren B. Hardy II is a Republican member of the Nevada Senate, representing Clark County District 12 (map) since 2002. Previously he served in the Nevada Assembly in 1991.

External links
Nevada State Legislature - Senator Warren B. Hardy II official government website
Project Vote Smart - Senator Warren B. Hardy II (NV) profile
Follow the Money - Warren B Hardy
2006 2004 2002 1992 1990 campaign contributions

Republican Party members of the Nevada Assembly
Republican Party Nevada state senators
1963 births
Living people